Myrmecopsis polistes is a moth of the subfamily Arctiinae. It was described by Jacob Hübner in 1818. It is found in Mexico, Guatemala and Brazil (Amazonas, Tefé, Pará).

References

 

Euchromiina
Moths described in 1818